An uncrewed vehicle or unmanned vehicle is a vehicle without a person on board. Uncrewed vehicles can either be under telerobotic control—remote controlled or remote guided vehicles—or they can be autonomously controlled—autonomous vehicles—which are capable of sensing their environment and navigating on their own.

Types
There are different types of uncrewed vehicles:
 Remote control vehicle (RC), such as radio-controlled cars or radio-controlled aircraft
 Unmanned ground vehicle (UGV), such as the autonomous cars, or unmanned combat vehicles (UCGV)
Self-driving truck
Driverless tractor
 Unmanned ground and aerial vehicle (UGAV), unmanned vehicle with hybrid locomotion methods
 Unmanned aerial vehicle (UAV), unmanned aircraft commonly known as "drone"
 Unmanned combat aerial vehicle (UCAV)
Medium-altitude long-endurance unmanned aerial vehicle (MALE)
 Miniature UAV (SUAV)
 Delivery drone
 Micro air vehicle (MAV)
 Target drone
 Autonomous spaceport drone ship
 Uncrewed surface vehicle (USV), also known as "surface drone", for the operation on the surface of the water
 Unmanned underwater vehicle (UUV), also known as "underwater drone", for the operation underwater
Remotely operated underwater vehicle (ROUV)
Autonomous underwater vehicle (AUV)
Intervention AUV (IAUV)
Underwater glider
 Uncrewed spacecraft, both remote controlled ("uncrewed space mission") and autonomous ("robotic spacecraft" or "space probe")

See also
 Vehicular automation
 Optionally piloted vehicle
 Automatic train operation (ATO), such as the "Driverless Train"
 Robot

References

 
Emerging technologies